Alexeyevsky (masculine), Alexeyevskaya (feminine), or Alexeyevskoye (neuter) is the name of several inhabited localities in Russia.

Altai Krai
As of 2010, one rural locality in Altai Krai bears this name:
Alexeyevsky, Altai Krai, a settlement in Velizhansky Selsoviet of Pankrushikhinsky District

Arkhangelsk Oblast
As of 2010, twelve rural localities in Arkhangelsk Oblast bear this name:
Alexeyevskaya, Konoshsky District, Arkhangelsk Oblast, a village in Yertsevsky Selsoviet of Konoshsky District
Alexeyevskaya, Alekseyevsky Selsoviet, Krasnoborsky District, Arkhangelsk Oblast, a village in Alekseyevsky Selsoviet of Krasnoborsky District
Alexeyevskaya, Belosludsky Selsoviet, Krasnoborsky District, Arkhangelsk Oblast, a village in Belosludsky Selsoviet of Krasnoborsky District
Alexeyevskaya, Lyakhovsky Selsoviet, Krasnoborsky District, Arkhangelsk Oblast, a village in Lyakhovsky Selsoviet of Krasnoborsky District
Alexeyevskaya, Nyandomsky District, Arkhangelsk Oblast, a village in Moshinsky Selsoviet of Nyandomsky District
Alexeyevskaya, Plesetsky District, Arkhangelsk Oblast, a village in Tarasovsky Selsoviet of Plesetsky District
Alexeyevskaya, Ustyansky District, Arkhangelsk Oblast, a village in Rostovsky Selsoviet of Ustyansky District
Alexeyevskaya, Velsky District, Arkhangelsk Oblast, a village in Verkhneustkuloysky Selsoviet of Velsky District
Alexeyevskaya, Afanasyevsky Selsoviet, Verkhnetoyemsky District, Arkhangelsk Oblast, a village in Afanasyevsky Selsoviet of Verkhnetoyemsky District
Alexeyevskaya, Fedkovsky Selsoviet, Verkhnetoyemsky District, Arkhangelsk Oblast, a village in Fedkovsky Selsoviet of Verkhnetoyemsky District
Alexeyevskaya, Verkhnetoyemsky Selsoviet, Verkhnetoyemsky District, Arkhangelsk Oblast, a village in Verkhnetoyemsky Selsoviet of Verkhnetoyemsky District
Alexeyevskaya, Vinogradovsky District, Arkhangelsk Oblast, a village in Boretsky Selsoviet of Vinogradovsky District

Republic of Bashkortostan
As of 2010, one rural locality in the Republic of Bashkortostan bears this name:
Alexeyevskoye, Republic of Bashkortostan, a village in Inzersky Selsoviet of Arkhangelsky District

Bryansk Oblast
As of 2010, three rural localities in Bryansk Oblast bear this name:
Alexeyevsky, Mglinsky District, Bryansk Oblast, a khutor in Oskolkovsky Selsoviet of Mglinsky District
Alexeyevsky, Surazhsky District, Bryansk Oblast, a settlement in Kulazhsky Selsoviet of Surazhsky District
Alexeyevsky, Vygonichsky District, Bryansk Oblast, a settlement in Khmelevsky Selsoviet of Vygonichsky District

Chelyabinsk Oblast
As of 2010, one rural locality in Chelyabinsk Oblast bears this name:
Alexeyevsky, Chelyabinsk Oblast, a settlement in Magnitny Selsoviet of Agapovsky District

Ivanovo Oblast
As of 2010, one rural locality in Ivanovo Oblast bears this name:
Alexeyevskoye, Ivanovo Oblast, a selo in Ilyinsky District

Kaluga Oblast
As of 2010, four rural localities in Kaluga Oblast bear this name:
Alexeyevsky, Ferzikovsky District, Kaluga Oblast, a settlement in Ferzikovsky District
Alexeyevsky, Lyudinovsky District, Kaluga Oblast, a village in Lyudinovsky District
Alexeyevskoye, Peremyshlsky District, Kaluga Oblast, a village in Peremyshlsky District
Alexeyevskoye, Yukhnovsky District, Kaluga Oblast, a village in Yukhnovsky District

Kirov Oblast
As of 2010, one rural locality in Kirov Oblast bears this name:
Alexeyevskoye, Kirov Oblast, a selo in Bezbozhnikovsky Rural Okrug of Murashinsky District

Kostroma Oblast
As of 2010, two rural localities in Kostroma Oblast bear this name:
Alexeyevskoye, Antropovsky District, Kostroma Oblast, a village in Kotelnikovskoye Settlement of Antropovsky District
Alexeyevskoye, Neysky District, Kostroma Oblast, a village in Kotkishevskoye Settlement of Neysky District

Krasnodar Krai
As of 2010, four rural localities in Krasnodar Krai bear this name:
Alexeyevsky, Krasnodar Krai, a khutor in Sokolovsky Rural Okrug of Gulkevichsky District
Alexeyevskoye, Sochi, Krasnodar Krai, a selo in Kirovsky Rural Okrug of the city of Sochi
Alexeyevskoye, Kushchyovsky District, Krasnodar Krai, a selo in Razdolnensky Rural Okrug of Kushchyovsky District
Alexeyevskaya, Krasnodar Krai, a stanitsa in Alekseyevsky Rural Okrug of Tikhoretsky District

Kursk Oblast
As of 2010, two rural localities in Kursk Oblast bear this name:
Alexeyevsky, Korenevsky District, Kursk Oblast, a khutor in Plodosovkhozsky Selsoviet of Korenevsky District
Alexeyevsky, Zheleznogorsky District, Kursk Oblast, a settlement in Ryshkovsky Selsoviet of Zheleznogorsky District

Leningrad Oblast
As of 2010, one rural locality in Leningrad Oblast bears this name:
Alexeyevskaya, Leningrad Oblast, a village in Vinnitskoye Settlement Municipal Formation of Podporozhsky District

Lipetsk Oblast
As of 2010, one rural locality in Lipetsk Oblast bears this name:
Alexeyevsky, Lipetsk Oblast, a settlement in Voskresensky Selsoviet of Dankovsky District

Mari El Republic
As of 2010, three rural localities in the Mari El Republic bear this name:
Alexeyevsky, Mari El Republic, a settlement in Alekseyevsky Rural Okrug of Sovetsky District
Alexeyevskoye, Mari-Tureksky District, Mari El Republic, a selo under the administrative jurisdiction of the urban-type settlement of Mari-Turek, Mari-Tureksky District
Alexeyevskoye, Volzhsky District, Mari El Republic, a selo in Emekovsky Rural Okrug of Volzhsky District

Moscow Oblast
As of 2010, two rural localities in Moscow Oblast bear this name:
Alexeyevskoye, Moscow Oblast, a village in Sokolovskoye Rural Settlement of Solnechnogorsky District
Alexeyevskaya, Moscow Oblast, a village in Sobolevskoye Rural Settlement of Orekhovo-Zuyevsky District

Nizhny Novgorod Oblast
As of 2010, one rural locality in Nizhny Novgorod Oblast bears this name:
Alexeyevsky, Nizhny Novgorod Oblast, a settlement in Chugunovsky Selsoviet of Vorotynsky District

Novosibirsk Oblast
As of 2010, one rural locality in Novosibirsk Oblast bears this name:
Alexeyevsky, Novosibirsk Oblast, a settlement in Iskitimsky District

Omsk Oblast
As of 2010, two rural localities in Omsk Oblast bear this name:
Alexeyevsky, Gorkovsky District, Omsk Oblast, a settlement in Alekseyevsky Rural Okrug of Gorkovsky District
Alexeyevsky, Lyubinsky District, Omsk Oblast, a settlement in Alekseyevsky Rural Okrug of Lyubinsky District

Oryol Oblast
As of 2010, five rural localities in Oryol Oblast bear this name:
Alexeyevsky, Gnezdilovsky Selsoviet, Bolkhovsky District, Oryol Oblast, a settlement in Gnezdilovsky Selsoviet of Bolkhovsky District
Alexeyevsky, Novosinetsky Selsoviet, Bolkhovsky District, Oryol Oblast, a settlement in Novosinetsky Selsoviet of Bolkhovsky District
Alexeyevsky, Berezovsky Selsoviet, Dmitrovsky District, Oryol Oblast, a settlement in Berezovsky Selsoviet of Dmitrovsky District
Alexeyevsky, Malobobrovsky Selsoviet, Dmitrovsky District, Oryol Oblast, a settlement in Malobobrovsky Selsoviet of Dmitrovsky District
Alexeyevsky, Shablykinsky District, Oryol Oblast, a settlement in Navlinsky Selsoviet of Shablykinsky District

Pskov Oblast
As of 2010, one rural locality in Pskov Oblast bears this name:
Alexeyevskoye, Pskov Oblast, a village in Loknyansky District

Rostov Oblast
As of 2010, two rural localities in Rostov Oblast bear this name:
Alexeyevsky, Oblivsky District, Rostov Oblast, a khutor in Alekseyevskoye Rural Settlement of Oblivsky District
Alexeyevsky, Verkhnedonskoy District, Rostov Oblast, a khutor in Meshkovskoye Rural Settlement of Verkhnedonskoy District

Samara Oblast
As of 2010, two rural localities in Samara Oblast bear this name:
Alexeyevsky, Bolshechernigovsky District, Samara Oblast, a settlement in Bolshechernigovsky District
Alexeyevsky, Krasnoarmeysky District, Samara Oblast, a settlement in Krasnoarmeysky District

Saratov Oblast
As of 2010, three rural localities in Saratov Oblast bear this name:
Alexeyevsky, Kalininsky District, Saratov Oblast, a settlement in Kalininsky District
Alexeyevsky, Romanovsky District, Saratov Oblast, a settlement in Romanovsky District
Alexeyevsky, Samoylovsky District, Saratov Oblast, a settlement in Samoylovsky District

Stavropol Krai
As of 2010, two rural localities in Stavropol Krai bear this name:
Alexeyevskoye, Andropovsky District, Stavropol Krai, a selo in Krasnoyarsky Selsoviet of Andropovsky District
Alexeyevskoye, Blagodarnensky District, Stavropol Krai, a selo in Blagodarnensky District

Republic of Tatarstan
As of 2010, two inhabited localities in the Republic of Tatarstan bear this name.

Urban localities
Alexeyevskoye, Republic of Tatarstan, an urban-type settlement in Alexeyevsky District

Rural localities
Alexeyevsky, Republic of Tatarstan, a settlement in Laishevsky District

Tula Oblast
As of 2010, one rural locality in Tula Oblast bears this name:
Alexeyevsky, Tula Oblast, a settlement in Nikitsky Rural Okrug of Volovsky District

Tver Oblast
As of 2010, nine rural localities in Tver Oblast bear this name:
Alexeyevskoye, Andreapolsky District, Tver Oblast, a village in Andreapolsky District
Alexeyevskoye, Bezhetsky District, Tver Oblast, a village in Bezhetsky District
Alexeyevskoye, Kalininsky District, Tver Oblast, a village in Kalininsky District
Alexeyevskoye, Kalininsky District, Tver Oblast, a village in Kalininsky District
Alexeyevskoye, Kashinsky District, Tver Oblast, a village in Kashinsky District
Alexeyevskoye, Ostashkovsky District, Tver Oblast, a village in Ostashkovsky District
Alexeyevskoye, Rameshkovsky District, Tver Oblast, a village in Rameshkovsky District
Alexeyevskoye, Selizharovsky District, Tver Oblast, a village in Selizharovsky District
Alexeyevskoye, Vyshnevolotsky District, Tver Oblast, a selo in Vyshnevolotsky District

Udmurt Republic
As of 2010, one rural locality in the Udmurt Republic bears this name:
Alexeyevsky, Udmurt Republic, a vyselok in Gulekovsky Selsoviet of Glazovsky District

Vladimir Oblast
As of 2010, one rural locality in Vladimir Oblast bears this name:
Alexeyevskoye, Vladimir Oblast, a selo in Kovrovsky District

Volgograd Oblast
As of 2010, one rural locality in Volgograd Oblast bears this name:
Alexeyevskaya, Volgograd Oblast, a stanitsa in Alekseyevsky Selsoviet of Alexeyevsky District

Vologda Oblast
As of 2010, seven rural localities in Vologda Oblast bear this name:
Alexeyevskoye, Chagodoshchensky District, Vologda Oblast, a village in Belokrestsky Selsoviet of Chagodoshchensky District
Alexeyevskoye, Vologodsky District, Vologda Oblast, a village in Novlensky Selsoviet of Vologodsky District
Alexeyevskoye, Vytegorsky District, Vologda Oblast, a settlement in Devyatinsky Selsoviet of Vytegorsky District
Alexeyevskaya, Babayevsky District, Vologda Oblast, a village in Pyazhozersky Selsoviet of Babayevsky District
Alexeyevskaya, Kirillovsky District, Vologda Oblast, a village in Lipovsky Selsoviet of Kirillovsky District
Alexeyevskaya, Syamzhensky District, Vologda Oblast, a village in Zhityevsky Selsoviet of Syamzhensky District
Alexeyevskaya, Velikoustyugsky District, Vologda Oblast, a village in Viktorovsky Selsoviet of Velikoustyugsky District

Voronezh Oblast
As of 2010, two rural localities in Voronezh Oblast bear this name:
Alexeyevsky, Buturlinovsky District, Voronezh Oblast, a settlement in Karaychevskoye Rural Settlement of Buturlinovsky District
Alexeyevsky, Novokhopyorsky District, Voronezh Oblast, a settlement in Kolenovskoye Rural Settlement of Novokhopyorsky District

Yaroslavl Oblast
As of 2010, six rural localities in Yaroslavl Oblast bear this name:
Alexeyevskoye, Danilovsky District, Yaroslavl Oblast, a village in Semivragovsky Rural Okrug of Danilovsky District
Alexeyevskoye, Nekrasovsky District, Yaroslavl Oblast, a village in Grebovsky Rural Okrug of Nekrasovsky District
Alexeyevskoye, Nazarovsky Rural Okrug, Rybinsky District, Yaroslavl Oblast, a village in Nazarovsky Rural Okrug of Rybinsky District
Alexeyevskoye, Shashkovsky Rural Okrug, Rybinsky District, Yaroslavl Oblast, a village in Shashkovsky Rural Okrug of Rybinsky District
Alexeyevskoye, Lyutovsky Rural Okrug, Yaroslavsky District, Yaroslavl Oblast, a village in Lyutovsky Rural Okrug of Yaroslavsky District
Alexeyevskoye, Teleginsky Rural Okrug, Yaroslavsky District, Yaroslavl Oblast, a village in Teleginsky Rural Okrug of Yaroslavsky District

See also
Alexey
Alexeyevka, Russia